Pambos Pittas (born July 26, 1966) is a former international Cypriot football defender and former captain of Cyprus national football team and Apollon Limassol.

He and Ioannis Okkas have the most appearances with Cyprus national football team  (82 appearances).  Pittas played for Apollon Limassol and AEL FC.

External links 
 

1966 births
Living people
Apollon Limassol FC players
AEL Limassol players
Cypriot footballers
Greek Cypriot people
Association football defenders
Cyprus international footballers
Sportspeople from Limassol